The 2017 United States Women's Curling Championship was held from February 11 to 18 at the Xfinity Arena in Everett, Washington. It was held in conjunction with the 2017 United States Men's Curling Championship.

Teams 
Eight teams qualified to participate in the 2017 national championship.

Round-robin standings  
Final round-robin standings

Round-robin results 
All draw times are listed in Central Standard Time.

Draw 1 
Sunday, February 12, 4:00pm

Draw 2 
Monday, February 13, 9:00am

Draw 3 
Monday, February 13, 7:00pm

Draw 4 
Tuesday, February 14, 12:00pm

Draw 5 
Tuesday, February 14, 8:00pm

Draw 6 
Wednesday, February 15, 2:00pm

Draw 7 
Thursday, February 16, 8:00am

Playoffs

Semifinal 
Friday, February 17, 12:00 pm PT

Final  
Saturday, February 18, 11:00 am PT

References

External links 

 Curling Zone Main Page for 2017 USA Women's Curling Championship

United States Women's Curling Championship
Curling in Washington (state)
United States National Curling Championships
Women's curling competitions in the United States